The 41st National Assembly of Quebec consists of those elected in the 2014 general election. Philippe Couillard (Liberal) is the premier.

Member list

Cabinet ministers are in bold, party leaders are in italic and the president of the National Assembly is marked with a †.

Standings changes since the 41st general election

References

41